Nemipterus isacanthus, commonly known as the teardrop threadfin bream, is a marine fish native to the western Pacific Ocean.

References

Fish of Thailand
Fish described in 1873
Fish of the Pacific Ocean
isacanthus